Vidor is a town and comune in the province of Treviso, Veneto, north-eastern Italy.

Twin towns
Vidor is twinned with:

  Petritoli, Italy

References

Cities and towns in Veneto